The Astounding Adventures of Charlie Peace was a comic strip in the UK comic Buster, based on the real-life exploits of nineteenth-century thief Charles Peace. The first strip was published on 20 July 1964 in Valiant as a special preview, then ran in Buster from 27 June 1964 to 15 June 1974.  When it started it was set in Victorian times, but in an episode published in January 1968 Charlie was tricked by an inventor into entering a time machine disguised as a safe, and transported to modern London.

The strip was drawn by Eric Bradbury (1964–1965), Tom Kerr (1964–1966), Jack Pamby (1965–1974), Alan Philpott (1966), Douglas Maxted (1966), and Anon (1966). The strip's principal artist was Jack Pamby, who drew every issue between August 1966 and June 1974.

Later appearances 

In 2005, Peace was featured in the comic series Albion by Alan Moore, Leah Moore and John Reppion. In that series Charlie teams up with two much-younger allies to crack a prison that is holding guilty and innocent special beings, imprisoned simply for being different.

Sources

British comic strips
1964 comics debuts
1974 comics endings
Comics characters introduced in 1964
British comics characters
Fictional thieves
Crime comics
Comics about time travel
Comics set in the 19th century
Comic strips based on real people
Fleetway and IPC Comics
Comics set in the United Kingdom